M. J. Perry may refer to:

Malcolm Perry (physicist) (born 1951), theoretical physicist
Mark J. Perry, American professor of economics and finance
Matthew J. Perry (1921 – 2011), United States jurist and federal judge

See also
Perry (surname)